Alain DesRochers is a Canadian film director and screenwriter. DesRochers studied first at St-Jean-Sur-Richelieu College in the early 1980s and then at Concordia University earning himself a Bachelor of Fine Arts degree at the end of the decade. He began his career by directing music videos and television commercials. He got his big break directing several episodes of the TV series The Hunger. His first feature film La Bouteille (2000) earned him a nomination for the Genie Award for Best Achievement in Direction. His second feature, the action film Nitro, was very successful at the Quebec box office and beat out several American blockbusters in its opening weekend.

Selected filmography
The Bottle (La Bouteille) - 2000
Nitro - 2007
The Comeback (Cabotins) - 2010
Wushu Warrior - 2010
Gerry - 2011
Darwin - 2015
Nitro Rush - 2016
Security - 2017
Bon Cop, Bad Cop 2 - 2017
Bad Blood - 2017
Transplant - 2020 - episode #4-6: "Saleh"/"Eid"/"Trigger Warning"

References

External links

Living people
Canadian screenwriters in French
French Quebecers
Film directors from Quebec
Concordia University alumni
Year of birth missing (living people)
Place of birth missing (living people)
Canadian television directors
Canadian music video directors